Djigui Diarra (born 27 February 1995) is a Malian professional footballer who plays as a goalkeeper for Tanzanian Premier League club Young Africans and the Mali national team. He also represented his country at the 2015 FIFA U-20 World Cup, where they achieved a third-place finish.

Club career
Diarra joined Tanzanian club Young Africans in August 2021.

International career

Youth
Diarra was set to represent his country at the 2015 African U-20 Championship, but broke his hand during a CAF Champions League match against AS GNN, and was ultimately not selected for the squad.

In May 2015, he was named in Mali's squad to represent the national under-20 team at the 2015 FIFA U-20 World Cup in New Zealand. Diarra, the team captain, blocked nine shots, including a penalty, in their quarterfinal match against Germany. They eventually won by penalty shootout, by a score of 4–3. They were eliminated in the semifinals by Serbia, but defeated Senegal in the third-place match.

Additionally, he earned three caps with the Mali under-23 national team during the 2015 Africa U-23 Cup of Nations in late 2015, recording one shutout.

Senior
Diarra was called up to the Mali national team for the 2016 African Nations Championship qualification, and made his senior international debut during the preliminary round, in a 3–1 victory against Guinea-Bissau on 5 July 2015. He also appeared in a 2–1 victory against Mauritania on 18 October. With these victories, Mali qualified for the 2016 African Nations Championship, held in Rwanda. Diarra was once again named to the 23-man squad, and recorded three shutouts in six matches while Mali reached the finals, where they lost 3–0 to DR Congo. Diarra was named to the Tournament XI as a substitute.

Career statistics

International

Honours

Club
Stade Malien
 Malian Première Division: 2012–13, 2013–14, 2014–15, 2016, 2019–20, 2020–21
 Malian Cup: 2013, 2015, 2018
 Malian Super Cup: 2014, 2015
 ((Tanzania Premier league ) 2021,2022

International
Mali
 African Nations Championship runners-up: 2016

Mali U20
 FIFA U-20 World Cup third place: 2015

Individual
 CAF Team of the Year: 2015 (as a substitute)
 African Nations Championship Best XI: 2016 (as a substitute)
 Malian Première Division Player of the Year: 2014–15

2022 Tanzania premier league (NBC) trophy.

.2021-22 Tanzania FA Cup (Azam sports federation cup) Trophy.

.
2021-22 Best Goal keeper of Tanzania premier league (NBC).

References

External links

 
 
 

Living people
1995 births
Sportspeople from Bamako
Malian footballers
Association football goalkeepers
Mali international footballers
Mali under-20 international footballers
Malian Première Division players
Stade Malien players
Young Africans S.C. players
Mali A' international footballers
2015 Africa U-23 Cup of Nations players
2017 Africa Cup of Nations players
2019 Africa Cup of Nations players
2021 Africa Cup of Nations players
21st-century Malian people
Tanzanian Premier League players
2016 African Nations Championship players
2020 African Nations Championship players
Malian expatriate sportspeople in Tanzania
Expatriate footballers in Tanzania
Malian expatriate footballers